Devlet Giray may refer to:
Khans of the Crimean Khanate:
 Devlet I Giray (1512–1577), reigned from 1551 to 1577
 Devlet II Giray (1648–1718), reigned in 1699–1702 and 1709–13
 Devlet III Giray (1647–1717), reigned from 1716 to 1717
 Devlet VI Giray (1730–1780), reigned in 1769–70 and 1775–77
Various members of the Giray house, including:
Circa 1400 Possibly the founder, according to an old source
c 1588: brother of Canibek Giray
c 1601: son of Saadet II Giray, killed by Gazi II Giray
c 1623: the father of Adil Giray
c 1756: brother of Halim Giray

See also
 Devlet
 Giray (disambiguation)